The Episcopal Palace, formerly known as the Hôtel du grand Doyenné, is the seat of the Archdiocese of Strasbourg. A French Baroque hôtel particulier of the 1720s, it is located between Rue du Parchemin and Rue Brûlée, near Place Broglie, on Grande Île, the historic city center of Strasbourg, in the French department of the Bas-Rhin, Alsace. It has been classified as a monument historique since 1929.

History
The palace was built for the Dean of the Grand Chapter of Strasbourg Cathedral, Frédéric Constantin de La Tour d'Auvergne (1682–1732) of the House of La Tour d'Auvergne, between 1724 (1722, according to other sources) and 1732 (1731, 1733 or 1734 according to other sources). It was thus called Hôtel du grand Doyenné. The plans were provided by Robert de Cotte, who would later design the Palais Rohan. The executive architect was Auguste Malo-Saussard (born 1690, last recorded alive in 1737; sometimes written Malo Auguste Saussard). The Hôtel du grand Doyenné was the first of the many stately 18th-century hôtels particuliers of Strasbourg and served as a structural model to most: two ornate façades (here of almost identical design), a grand portal, a large courtyard, a small garden.

During the French Revolution (1789), the Hôtel du grand Doyenné was confiscated and declared "bien national" (State-owned), before being bought by Marshal Luckner. After changing hands a few more times, the hôtel became the property of the Catholic Church in 1855. It became the residence and workplace of the Bishop of Strasbourg (since 1988: Archbishop of Strasbourg) the same year.

References

External links

L'Archevêché - 16 rue Brûlée  on archi-wiki.org

Literature
Recht, Roland; Foessel, Georges; Klein, Jean-Pierre: Connaître Strasbourg, 1988, pages 120–121

See also
Hôtel de Hanau
Hôtel des Deux-Ponts
Hôtel de Klinglin

Christianity in Strasbourg
Episcopal palaces
Baroque buildings in France
Houses completed in 1732
1724 establishments in France
Monuments historiques of Strasbourg
Hôtels particuliers in Strasbourg